The Roman Catholic Diocese of Mbalmayo is a diocese located in the city of Mbalmayo in the Ecclesiastical province of Yaoundé in Cameroon.

History
 June 24, 1961: Established as Diocese of Mbalmayo from Metropolitan Archdiocese of Yaoundé

Bishops
 Bishops of Mbalmayo (Roman rite), in reverse chronological order
 Bishop Joseph-Marie Ndi-Okalla (since December 27, 2016)
 Bishop Adalbert Ndzana (March 7, 1987  – December 27, 2016)
 Bishop Paul Etoga (June 24, 1961  – March 7, 1987)

Coadjutor bishop
Adalbert Ndzana (1984-1987)

Other priest of this diocese who became bishop
Philippe Alain Mbarga, appointed Bishop of Ebolowa in 2016

See also
Roman Catholicism in Cameroon

References

External links
 GCatholic.org

Mbalmayo
Christian organizations established in 1961
Roman Catholic dioceses and prelatures established in the 20th century
1961 establishments in Cameroon
Roman Catholic Ecclesiastical Province of Yaoundé